This is a list of nominated candidates for the Bloc Québécois political party in the 40th Canadian federal election.

Candidates

See also
Results of the Canadian federal election, 2008
Results by riding for the Canadian federal election, 2008

References

2008
Candidates in the 2008 Canadian federal election